Biobessa is a genus of longhorn beetles of the subfamily Lamiinae.

 Biobessa albopunctata Breuning, 1935
 Biobessa beatrix Gahan, 1898
 Biobessa holzschuhi Téocchi, 1991

References

Crossotini